Catherine D. Perry (born 1952) is a senior United States district judge of the United States District Court for the Eastern District of Missouri.

Education and career

Born in Hobart, Oklahoma, Perry received a Bachelor of Arts degree from University of Oklahoma in 1977, and a Juris Doctor from Washington University School of Law in 1980. After graduation she became an adjunct professor of law at Washington University School of Law, and taught there intermittently from 1981 to 1994. She also served as a United States magistrate judge of the United States District Court for the Eastern District of Missouri from 1990 to 1994.

Federal judicial service

On July 15, 1994, Perry was nominated by President Bill Clinton to a seat on the United States District Court for the Eastern District of Missouri vacated by Clyde S. Cahill. She was confirmed by the United States Senate on October 6, 1994, and received her commission the following day. She served as Chief Judge from 2009 to 2016. She assumed senior status on December 31, 2018.

Notable ruling

On August 18, 2014 Perry denied motions by the ACLU for temporary restraining orders against six police officers to prevent the enforcement of a 5-second rule in Ferguson, Missouri. Perry cited  the need for law enforcement's protection of property and the availability of a "free-speech zone". However, at the time of this ruling the free speech zone was off-limits to the public.

References

Sources

1952 births
Judges of the United States District Court for the Eastern District of Missouri
Living people
People from Hobart, Oklahoma
United States district court judges appointed by Bill Clinton
University of Oklahoma alumni
Washington University School of Law alumni
Washington University in St. Louis faculty
United States magistrate judges
20th-century American judges
21st-century American judges
20th-century American women judges
21st-century American women judges